Kohleria amabilis, the tree gloxinia, is a species of the flowering plant belonging to the family Gesneriaceae.

Synonyms
 Achimenes amabilis   (Planch. & Linden) Van Houtte 
 Achimenes picta  Benth. 
 Diastema pictum   (Benth.) Walp. 
 Isoloma amabile   (Planch. & Linden) hort. ex Bellair & St.-Lég. 
 Isoloma amabilis   (Planch. & Linden) Bellair & St.-Lég. 
 Isoloma bogotense var. amabile   (Planch. & Linden) Voss 
 Tydaea amabilis  Planch. & Linden 
 Tydaea ceciliae  André 
 Tydaea venosa hort. ex Lesc.

Varieties
Kohleria amabilis var. amabilis 
Kohleria amabilis var. bogotensis (syn. K. bogotensis)  (G. Nicholson) L.P. Kvist & L.E. Skog

Description

Kohleria amabilis var. bogotensis has dark green leaves and yellow and red-orange flowers. Flowering period extends from late winter through the spring and summer. These tropical plants are rhizomatous and have a period of seasonal leafless dormancy.

Distribution
This species is native to Honduras (Mesoamerica) and Colombia.

References

 Kvist, L.P. & L.E. Skog.  1992.   Revision of Kohleria (Gesneriaceae). Smithsonian Contributions to Botany 79: 1-83.
 H. G. A. Engler & K. A. E. Prantl, Nat. Pflanzenfam. 4(3b):178.  1894

External links
Kohleria bogotensis
Plantillustrations
Encyclopedia of Life

Gesnerioideae